Horse-ripping, or horse slashing, is an animal cruelty phenomenon involving serious injuries in horses, often involving mutilation of their genitalia and slashing of the flank or neck. It has not been established, however, how often these injuries are caused by human cruelty. "Horse-ripping" is not an entirely neutral term since it implies there is always a human act behind the mutilations.

Incidents
There were 160 reported incidents in Britain between 1983 and 1993, and 300 incidents in Germany between 1992 and 1998.

It has become a widespread belief in recent years that these attacks are carried out deliberately by people, and generally sexually motivated. Animal welfare officers have also drawn links between attacks on horses and 'fertility cults'. At least one case initially believed to be horse-ripping was later shown to have been caused by another horse.

Convictions are rare, though a man has been convicted in the Netherlands for a large number of such attacks on horses and ponies, along with the murder of a homeless person and the attempted murder of several others.

Horse-ripping, which is regarded as pathological, is distinguished from castration of male animals, which is regarded as a normal pastoral practice.

In Great Wyrley, England, during the Edwardian period George Edalji was wrongly convicted of horse ripping. Sir Arthur Conan Doyle, author of the Sherlock Holmes series, defended Edalji.

Critique

Investigations have shown it doubtful whether all 'horse-ripping' incidents can be ascribed to human acts. For the similar cattle mutilation, primarily a US phenomenon, UFOs, cults and animal cruelty have been blamed, but research showed there were natural or undetermined causes in the vast majority of cases.

Media and the public often regard all incidents of horses being found injured as resulting from human acts, even if it has not been proven that the causes are unnatural. For this reason, some would argue that the concept should be analysed in terms of mass psychology and might qualify as a moral panic phenomenon. However, it is agreed upon that true cases of human-inflicted mutilation are a pathological or criminal phenomenon.

In literature
The short story Romulus (1883) by the Danish author Karl Gjellerup features cruelty to a noble race horse. The story was inspired by a contemporary case where the Royal Chamberlain was accused of animal cruelty.

The play Equus from 1973 elaborates the psychology of a young horse mutilator. It also was inspired by a then-contemporary series of horse blindings. Based on the play, the film Equus was produced in 1977.

In Dostoyevsky's novel Crime and Punishment, the protagonist Rodion Raskolnikov has a dream about a mare being whipped and eventually bludgeoned to death with an iron bar by a drunken man, while a large crowd encourages and helps him.

The novel Arthur & George by Julian Barnes centers around  Arthur Conan Doyle's involvement with the Great Wryley Outrages, a series of mutilations committed against horses and other livestock in 1903.

See also
 Cattle mutilation 
 Horse sacrifice
 Moral panic
 Zoosadism

Notes

Further reading

 Schedel-Stupperich A. Criminal acts against horses--phenomenology and psychosocial construct  Dtsch Tierarztl Wochenschr. March 2002;109(3):116-9. (in German)
Yates, Roger; Powell, Chris; and Beirne, Piers. Horse Maiming in the English Countryside, Society and Animals, 9:1, 2001.

Cruelty to animals
Equine welfare